Martinja Vas is a small village southwest of Šentlovrenc in the Municipality of Trebnje in eastern Slovenia. The area is part of the historical region of Lower Carniola. The municipality is now included in the Southeast Slovenia Statistical Region.

The local church is dedicated to Mary Magdalene and belongs to the Parish of Šentlovrenc. It is a Gothic building, first mentioned in written documents dating to 1526.

References

External links
Martinja Vas at Geopedia

Populated places in the Municipality of Trebnje